The Union Ministry of Cooperation is a ministry under the Government of India which was formed in July 2021. The ministry provides a separate administrative, legal and policy framework for strengthening the cooperative movement in the country. The ministry's creation was announced on 6 July 2021 along with its vision statement of "Sahkar se samriddhi". Before the creation of this ministry, the objectives of this ministry were looked after by the Ministry of Agriculture.

The ministry works in strengthening co-operatives at the grassroot level, working to streamline processes for 'Ease of doing business' for co-operatives and enabling the development of Multi-State Co-operatives (MSCS). The same was initially announced by Finance Minister Nirmala Sitharaman while presenting the 2021 Union budget.

Objectives
The ministry was created with objectives of:

 To realise the vision of "Sahkar se Samriddhi" (prosperity through cooperation).
 To streamline processes for ‘'Ease of doing business’' for co-operatives and enable development of Multi-State Co-operatives (MSCS)
 to provide a separate administrative, legal and policy framework for strengthening the cooperative movements in the country.
 To deepen the cooperative as a true people-based movement reaching upto the grassroot level.

Cooperative Societies at National Level

Core Cooperative Society at National Level
National Cooperative Union of India Limited

Cooperative Banks at National Level
National Federation of State Cooperative Banks Limited
National Federation of Urban Cooperative Banks and Credit Societies Limited

Development Cooperative Banks at National Level
National Cooperative Land Development Banks Federation Limited
All India Industrial Cooperative Banks Federation Limited

Consumer Cooperative Societies at National Level
National Cooperative Consumer’s Federation of India Limited

Worker Cooperative Societies at National Level
National Federation of Labour Cooperative Limited

Housing Cooperative Societies at National Level
National Cooperative Housing Federation Limited

Producer/Marketing Cooperative Societies at National Level
National Federation of Industrial Cooperative Limited
Indian Farmers Fertiliser Cooperative Limited
Krishak Bharati Cooperative Limited
All India Federation of Cooperative Spinning Mills Limited
National Cooperative Dairy Federation of India Limited
National Heavy Engineering Cooperative Limited
All India Handloom Fabrics Marketing Cooperative Society Limited
National Federation of Fishermen’s Cooperative Limited
National Cooperative Tobacco Grower’s Federation Limited
Tribal Cooperative Marketing Development Federation of India Limited
National Federation of Cooperative Sugar Factories Limited 
National Agricultural Cooperative Marketing Federation of India
Petrofils Cooperative Limited (To be de-liquidated)

List of ministers 

Legend
 
Key
 No. - Incumbent number
  Assassinated or died in office
  Returned to office after a previous non-consecutive term
  Resigned

Department of Co-operation (State Ministers)

Criticism
Co-operative societies, being a subject of State List under the Seventh schedule of the Constitution, many experts raised concerns that, creating such a ministry at the central level would increase the power in the hands of the union government.

Kerala's Minister of Co-operation and Registration V. N. Vasavan stated that, "Creation of a new Cooperation ministry is an infringement upon the federal rights of the state governments. [....] This is an intrusion into the authority of the state governments."

See also
 Aavin
 Amul
 Cooperative movement in India

External links
 National Cooperative Union of India(NCUI)
 Ministry of Cooperation

References

Ministry of Co-operation
Co-operation
2021 establishments in India
Government agencies established in 2021